Bill Hamilton is an American journalist and the national security editor in the Washington Bureau at The New York Times.

References

External links 
 

Living people
The New York Times writers
Year of birth missing (living people)